The 2022 Everest Canadian Senior Curling Championships was held from December 4 to 10 at the Mariners Centre and the Yarmouth Curling Club in Yarmouth, Nova Scotia. The winning teams will represent Canada at the 2023 World Senior Curling Championships in Gangneung, South Korea.

This was the first time Yarmouth hosted the Canadian Senior Curling Championships, and sixth time overall that Nova Scotia hosted the championship.

Men

Teams
The teams are listed as follows:

Round-robin standings
Final round-robin standings

Round-robin results

All draws are listed in Atlantic Time (UTC−04:00).

Draw 1
Sunday, December 4, 4:00 pm

Draw 2
Sunday, December 4, 8:00 pm

Draw 3
Monday, December 5, 10:00 am

Draw 4
Monday, December 5, 2:00 pm

Draw 5
Monday, December 5, 6:00 pm

Draw 6
Monday, December 5, 9:00 pm

Draw 7
Tuesday, December 6, 8:30 am

Draw 8
Tuesday, December 6, 12:30 pm

Draw 9
Tuesday, December 6, 4:30 pm

Draw 10
Tuesday, December 6, 8:30 pm

Draw 11
Wednesday, December 7, 10:00 am

Draw 12
Wednesday, December 7, 2:00 pm

Draw 13
Wednesday, December 7, 6:00 pm

Seeding pool

Standings
Final Seeding Pool Standings
{|
|valign=top width=10%|

Results

Draw 14
Thursday, December 8, 8:30 am

Draw 16
Thursday, December 8, 4:30 pm

Draw 19
Friday, December 9, 2:00 pm

Championship pool

Standings
Final Championship Pool Standings

{|
|valign=top width=10%|

Results

Draw 15
Thursday, December 8, 12:30 pm

Draw 17
Thursday, December 8, 8:30 pm

Draw 18
Friday, December 9, 10:00 am

Draw 20
Friday, December 9, 6:00 pm

Playoffs

Semifinals
Saturday, December 10, 8:30 am

Bronze medal game
Saturday, December 10, 12:30 pm

Gold medal game
Saturday, December 10, 12:30 pm

Women

Teams
The teams are listed as follows:

Round-robin standings
Final round-robin standings

Round-robin results

All draws are listed in Atlantic Time (UTC−04:00).

Draw 1
Sunday, December 4, 4:00 pm

Draw 2
Sunday, December 4, 8:00 pm

Draw 3
Monday, December 5, 10:00 am

Draw 4
Monday, December 5, 2:00 pm

Draw 5
Monday, December 5, 6:00 pm

Draw 6
Monday, December 5, 9:00 pm

Draw 7
Tuesday, December 6, 8:30 am

Draw 8
Tuesday, December 6, 12:30 pm

Draw 9
Tuesday, December 6, 4:30 pm

Draw 10
Tuesday, December 6, 8:30 pm

Draw 11
Wednesday, December 7, 10:00 am

Draw 12
Wednesday, December 7, 2:00 pm

Draw 13
Wednesday, December 7, 6:00 pm

Seeding pool

Standings
Final Seeding Pool Standings
{|
|valign=top width=10%|

Results

Draw 14
Thursday, December 8, 8:30 am

Draw 16
Thursday, December 8, 4:30 pm

Draw 19
Friday, December 9, 2:00 pm

Championship pool

Standings
Final Championship Pool Standings

{|
|valign=top width=10%|

Results

Draw 15
Thursday, December 8, 12:30 pm

Draw 17
Thursday, December 8, 8:30 pm

Draw 18
Friday, December 9, 10:00 am

Draw 20
Friday, December 9, 6:00 pm

Playoffs

Semifinals
Saturday, December 10, 8:30 am

Bronze medal game
Saturday, December 10, 3:30 pm

Gold medal game
Saturday, December 10, 3:30 pm

References

External links

2022 in Canadian curling
2022 in Nova Scotia
Canadian Senior Curling
Curling competitions in Nova Scotia
Canadian Senior Curling Championships
Yarmouth, Nova Scotia